The piano action mechanism (also known as the key action mechanism or simply the action) of a piano or other musical keyboard is the mechanical assembly which translates the depression of the keys into rapid motion of a hammer, which creates sound by striking the strings. Action can refer to that of a piano or other musical keyboards, including the electronic or digital stage piano and synthesizer, on which some models have "weighted keys", which simulate the touch and feel of an acoustic piano. The design of the key action mechanism determines the "weighted keys" feeling; that is, the feeling of the heaviness of the touch of the keys."A professional pianist is likely to care most about the piano's action, because that is what controls its responsiveness and relative lightness--or heaviness--of touch. Roughly speaking, a piano's action is light when its keys fall easily under the fingers, and heavy when a noticeable downward thrust is required. The action, in short, is what makes a piano playable or not to an individual musician."

History

The piano action was the important innovation that Bartolomeo Cristofori created when he invented the piano in 1698. Other than in the action, the first pianos were quite similar in construction to contemporary harpsichords. With the piano, a hammer strikes the string, whereas with a harpsichord, a mechanism plucks the string. Cristofori's action already embodied many of the principles still found in 2000-era actions. It used levers to magnify the small motion of the piano key into a large motion of the hammer, and was arranged so that the very last part of the hammer's motion before striking the string would be purely the result of inertia and not propelled by the key; this prevents the key from pressing the felt-covered hammer firmly into the string, which would damp and stop the string vibrations and the sound.

After Cristofori's death in 1731, a number of piano makers (for instance, Gottfried Silbermann) built pianos with actions that were essentially copies of Cristofori's. Others produced quite different actions, often simpler and less effective ones. In the 1770s, the Augsburg builder Johann Andreas Stein developed an entirely new action in which the orientation of the hammer was reversed, with the hammer head closer to the player. This "Viennese" action was widely used by makers in Vienna, and was the action of pianos played by Haydn, Mozart, and Beethoven. It survived in Viennese pianos almost to the end of the 19th century.

The 2000s-era grand action is a distant descendant of Cristofori's original. It emerged from the work in the 1770s of Americus Backers, who established the normal action for English pianos. In the 19th century, the English action was further modified by French builders, notably in the invention of the repetition lever, which facilitated rapidly repeating notes. Perhaps the best-known English piano action of the nineteenth century is the Brooks action of 1810. One of the most well-known French piano actions was created by Jean Schwander in 1844 (the Schwander action is still used in Bechstein pianos) and improved upon by his son-in-law Josef Herrburger. At the turn of the century, Schwander-Herrburger merged with Brooks, giving us the Herrburger-Brooks piano action, which was the definitive piano action of the twentieth century. Throughout the history of the action, piano makers tended to make it heavier and sturdier, in response to the increasing size, weight, and robustness of the instrument, which was itself part of a general demand for a more powerful sound.

Upright action circa 1907

The action mechanism of a key consists of the key itself and all its appurtenances. A key appurtenances include a see-saw like leverage-system, the escapement, a supplementary device for repetition, and a check for hammer rebound. The illustration to the right is of a circa 1907 Wessell, Nickel and Gross upright action; the parts are listed below.

Ky, is the key in its resting position.

c, wherever found, represents a cushion of felt or soft leather upon which the different parts of the action rest or come in contact with each other. Their purpose is that of rendering the action noiseless and easy of operation.

Bnc R, shows the end of the balance rail, extending the entire length of the keyboard.

B P, is the balance pin. This is a perfectly round pin driven firmly in the balance rail. The bottom of the hole in the key fits closely around the balance pin; at the top, it is the shape of a mortise, parallel with the key, which allows the key to move only in the direction intended. The mortise in the wooden cap on top of the key at this point is lined with bushing cloth which holds the key in position laterally, and prevents looseness and rattling, yet allows the key to move easily.

L, is the lead put in this portion of the key to balance it, and to ensure uniformity of "touch," and quick and certain return of key to its rest position. As there is more or less difference in the length of keys, and also in the weight of the hammers operated by them, some keys are leaded much more heavily than others. In some cases the lead is inserted in the extreme back end of the key; in others it is put near the balance rail according to the requirement. In some actions the lead is omitted entirely; but in the best actions it is almost invariably present. In the action of the grand piano the keys are leaded in front of the balance rail instead of back of it. This is because, in the grand piano, the hammer rests in a horizontal position and its whole weight must be actually lifted and the force of gravity overcome, while in the upright, the hammer rests in a vertical position, only requiring to be thrown forward.

G P, is the guide pin, generally of oval shape, with the longest diameter in line with the key. The hole in the lower portion of the key, in which the guide pin works, is bushed with bushing cloth and is made to fit so closely that the key will not move laterally, yet not so tightly that the key will not work easily.

Bm, is a wooden block called the bottom; sometimes called the key-rocker. It is held in position by the two screws shown in cut by which it can be adjusted or regulated.

E, is the extension communicating the motion of the key to the upper part of the action. There are various ways in which the extension is connected to the bottom. In this action, the extension is made round at the lower end and fits snugly into a hole in the bottom upon a felt disc. When the action is taken out, the extensions simply lift out of the holes, and when it is put back it is necessary to enter each one in its place. In other actions, the upper side of the bottom where the extension rests has no hole but simply a felt covering upon which the extension rests; in this case it is necessary to provide what is called an extension guide which is hinged to the extension guide rail shown in the cut at the left of the extension. In actions of this kind, the extensions remain in place at all times and the trouble of placing them properly on the bottom when replacing the action is obviated. Other methods also are employed which are readily understood upon slight examination, but are essentially similar to the above. Instead of the bottom, a capstan screw is used in some actions as follows:

Cpn, is a capstan screw used in some actions in place of the bottom. It is turned by inserting a pointed instrument in one of the four holes, thus raising or lowering the capstan in regulating. The lower end of the extension is felted. In such actions the extension is invariably provided with the extension guide.

B, is the metal action bracket. The bracket is one solid piece of metal. There are generally four brackets in the upright action. The brackets rest on supports in and at the sides of the keybed, and are secured at the top by large bolts,

BB, which go through the metal plate and into the wooden frame or pin block. At the top of each bracket is an opening to receive this bolt and a thumbscrew (not shown in the cut, being behind the hammer) which fastens the action securely in position.

M R, is the main rail; so called because the main constituents of the action are attached to it. (Everything designated as "rail" in the action runs the entire length of the action in one solid piece.)

W, is the wippen. Those pieces upon which or by which the small letter g is shown are the flanges. The one at the left of the wippen is called the wippen flange. It is made fast to the main rail by a screw, and upon it the wippen is hinged by means of a "center-pin" at the lower end. The center-pin in the wippen is driven through a hole in which it fits tightly and immovably in the middle part, and it (the center-pin) is consequently stationary in the wippen. The flange extends down at the sides of the wippen and the holes in flange are made large enough to receive bushing cloth in which the center-pin works freely but not loosely. All flange joints are of this nature; some, however, are provided with a means for tightening the center-pin in the middle portion of the joint.

j, is the jack. The purpose of the jack is to communicate the motion of the wippen to the hammer. The precise adjustment of the jack and the adjacent parts upon which it depends for its exact movements, play an important part in regulating the "touch" of the piano.

js, jack spring. Its purpose is to hold the jack inward against the "nose" or "heel" of the hammer butt. (See Bt, hammer butt.)

Rr, regulating rail. The regulating button is shown attached to the rail by the regulating screw which is turned by means of its ring on top of Rr. The purpose of the regulating button is to throw the point of the jack out of the nose of the hammer butt, and allow the hammer to rebound from the string. If the button is too high, it does not throw or trip the jack in time to prevent blocking. When the button is too low, it disengages too soon, and much of the force of the key is lost before it reaches the hammer.

BR, is the block rail, felted on the side next to the jack which strikes against it when thrown from nose. This rail is absent in some actions, in which case the back of the jack is felted and strikes against the "back catch," which is also felted on inner side. (The back catch has no mark in the cut, but is explained below in connection with the "back check.")

BC, is the back check which is simply a piece of wood with a thick piece of felt glued to the inner face and suspended on a wire.

BCW, back check wire supporting the back check, and screwed to the wippen. The purpose of the back check is to check the hammer by coming in contact with the "back catch" (the backward projection of the butt), at a short distance from the string in its return, and prevent the hammer from falling entirely back to its rest position, thereby preventing quick repetition.

Bl, bridle. This is a piece of tape about an eighth of an inch wide with a piece of leather glued to the end and a hole near the end for the point of the "stirrup" or bridle wire. The cut shows where the bridle is fastened in the hammer butt by being put into the hole in the butt, and the back catch stem covered with glue and driven in by it which precludes all possibility of its coming loose. The bridle passes through a hole in the lower part of the back catch. Its purpose is to assist the hammer to return quickly by hanging to it with the weight of the wippen, extension, jack, etc., when the key is released. Thus the bridle becomes the main factor in the matter of quick repetition.

Bl W, bridle wire, screwed into wippen, bent in the shape of a buckle at top to hold bridle.

Bt, butt; or, more specifically, hammer butt. In some cheap actions the butt is joined to its flange g, by the means described under the head of wippen flange; but in this action the center-pin is held firmly in the butt by a small strip of brass containing a set screw; somewhat obscure in the cut, but discernible. All center-pins turn in the flange and not in the middle part.

HS, hammer shank in rest position.

H, hammer showing wood body or head, and covering of two layers of felt.

H R, hammer rail, resting on felt cushion, c, glued to rail or bracket. The hammer rail is held in position by the rod, shown under the hammer shank, which is hinged to the bracket at the lower end, and which allows it to be moved forward when the soft pedal is used. The soft pedal communicates with this rail by a rod which moves it forward and thereby shortens the stroke of the hammers and produces a softer tone.

sr, spring rail screwed to the brackets. This rail supports the light wire springs which assist the hammers in returning to rest position.

S, string.

D, is the damper head secured to the damper wire by a set screw.

DL, damper lever, working in damper flange g, which is screwed to main rail.

s, spoon; so called from its shape. It is screwed into the wippen. When the key is struck, the motion on the wippen throws the spoon forward, pushing the lower end of damper lever forward, and releasing the damper from its contact with the string. The damper is held against the string by the wire spring which is seen running from the damper flange to the top of the damper lever.

DR, damper rod. This is a rod running from the left or bass end of the action to the right as far as the dampers are continued in the treble. It is acted upon by the "loud" or damper pedal, which raises the outer projection, and by being hinged to the main rail about the same height as this projection, the entire rod is thrown outward against the lower ends of the damper levers, releasing all the dampers simultaneously. This being the only office of the right pedal, it is readily seen that this pedal does not increase the loudness, but simply sustains any number of tones struck successively, giving the effect of more volume.

Modern grand action

Notes

References

 Matthay, Tobias (1963) The act of touch in all its diversity: an analysis and synthesis of pianoforte tone-production, London: Bosworth & Co. (printed in London). 15th reprint of the 1st ed., London: Longmans & Co. (printed in New York) (1903); .

External links
Piano Tuning, by J. Cree Fischer, 1907, from Project Gutenberg

Piano